CTV3: Cool Tape Vol. 3 is the third studio album by American rapper and singer Jaden Smith and the fourth installment in the Cool Tape series (preceded by The Cool Cafe: Cool Tape Vol. 1, CTV2, and The Sunset Tapes: A Cool Tape Story). It includes features from Justin Bieber and Raury. The lead singles "Cabin Fever" and "Rainbow Bap" were released separately on July 23, 2020, and August 14, 2020.

Summary
Following the release of the album's lead single "Cabin Fever", the 17-track album was announced on August 14, 2020, and that it would feature guest appearances from Justin Bieber and Raury. Smith taught himself guitar for the album. Smith stated the album acts as a prequel to Syre, taking place when Smith was 15 years old going onto 17.

Reception 
Reviews commented on the nostalgic feeling of the album and its departure as something new and different from Smith's previous works. Some reviews noted that CTV3 branched off into new styles like '60s psych-rock.

Track listing
CTV3 has seventeen tracks that run for a total of 51 minutes.

Expanded release 
On August 28th, 2021 (exactly a year after the release of CTV3: Cool Tape Vol. 3) Jaden Smith released the CTV3: Day Tripper’s Edition, a 19-track expansion that includes features from Joey Badass, ¿Téo?, and Babe Rainbow. The first single off of his CTV3 Day Trippers Edition album was titled “BYE.” and was released early on June 22nd, 2021. Jaden is quoted as saying about the single, “I was sad when I made this song, but I’m happy it’s out. Welcome to CTV3, welcome to trippy summer. It was the time of our lives.”

References

2020 albums
Jaden Smith albums